Devall may refer to:

People
 Devall (surname), of Norman origin.
 Deval Patrick (born 1956), American politician

Places
 DeValls Bluff, Arkansas

See also
 Deval (disambiguation)
 Duval (surname)
 Duvall (surname)
 Laval (surname)